The Blackjack Mountains are a mountain range located in Gila County, Arizona. The peak has a topographic isolation of 17.88 miles (29 km), with the nearest higher peak lying to the south in the Pinal Mountains. The Blackjack mountains are located within the Tonto National Forest and are north of Globe, Arizona. The high point of the range, Apache Peaks, is ranked 36th in prominence for Arizona's most prominent peaks.

References

External links
 Blackjack Mountains – Peakbagger.com
 Apache Peaks – Peakbagger.com

Arizona transition zone mountain ranges
Mountain ranges of Gila County, Arizona
Mountain ranges of Arizona